Meyle is a surname. Notable people with the surname include:

 Gregor Meyle (born 1978), German singer-songwriter
 Lucy Meyle, New Zealand multidisciplinary artist